Pallickal is a village near the town of Kottarakara in the Indian state of Kerala.

References

Villages in Kollam district